Works '95–'05 is a compilation album by Yoshinori Sunahara. It was released on March 21, 2007. It peaked at number 107 on the Oricon Albums Chart.

Track listing

Charts

References

External links
 

2007 compilation albums
Yoshinori Sunahara albums
Ki/oon Records albums